Tissa is a municipality in the district Saale-Holzland, in Thuringia, in the eastern part of Germany.

References

Saale-Holzland-Kreis